Manila is a German-style board game designed by Franz-Benno Delonge and published in 2005 by Zoch Verlag and Rio Grande Games. It involves auctioning/bidding, betting/wagering, commodity speculation, dice rolling, and worker placement. It is set in colonial Manila.

Honors
2005 Deutscher Spiele Preis Best Family/Adult Game 3rd Place
2005 Japan Boardgame Prize Best Advanced Game Nominee
2005 Tric Trac Nominee
2006 As d'Or - Jeu de l'Année Nominee
2006 Golden Geek Best Family Board Game Nominee
2006 Nederlandse Spellenprijs Nominee
2007 Årets Spill Best Family Game Nominee

Contents
 1 game board
 4 ware loads
 4 dice
 4 value indicators
 20 cards
 3 boats 
 20 accomplices
 48 Philippines Coins
 79 Coin Token (1Peso 21, 2Peso 18, 5Peso 16, 10Peso 15, 20Peso 9)
 Rule booklet

References

External links 
 
 Manila at  Rio Grande Games
 Manila Rules at  Zoch Verlag

Board games introduced in 2005
Rio Grande Games games